Rose Vincent (pseudonym for Marie Rose Treffot-Jurgensen) (15 March 1918 – 15 June 2011) was a French journalist and writer.

Originally from Bresse Louhanaise, she worked as a teacher and served in the Resistance during the Second World War. She became a journalist and writer after the war.

She is the author of numerous works on the education of children, as well as works on India, where she lived 4 years, and novels, which received several awards.

Biography 
The daughter of teachers in the Louhans region, where she spent her childhood, Marie Rose Treffot graduated from the École normale supérieure de Sèvres, (1937) and obtained the agrégation of mathematics (1940–41).

In 1939, she married .

She taught at Dreux and Chartres (1940–43), while engaging in the Resistance, within the network "Defense de la France". She entered clandestinity from 1943, and collaborated in particular with the Cahiers de Défense de la France.

After the Liberation, she worked on the daily newspaper France-Soir, which grew out of the clandestine newspaper Défense de la France and worked to the creation of the magazine France et Monde. In 1951, she joined the editorial office of the women's weekly Elle, where she led the "Parents-enfants" section until 1973. At the same time, she became editor-in-chief of Votre Enfant (1954-1958) and Femina Pratique (1957).

In 1958, Rose Vincent founded the monthly Femme Pratique, of which she was the director and editor-in-chief until 1972.
 
She also published several books on the education of children.

She worked at promoting the cause of women's emancipation.
She moved to India (1972–1976) and the Netherlands (1979–1982) with her husband, Ambassador of France, and began a career as a writer.

In 1976, she participated in the launch of the daily , established by Joseph Fontanet.

After her return to France, she published several historical works and novels, which won her many prizes, including the prix Maurice Genevoix.

Works 
1957: 
1962: 
1965: 
1969: 
1971: 
1978: , Prix Auguste Furtado, Prix littéraire de l'Asie in 1978)
1981: 
1982: 
1985:  Prix Jules Favre; Prix RTL; Prix du récit historique; Prix des Pays Protestants
1987:  Prix Maurice Genevoix; Prix Emile Guillaumin; Prix de culture Bourguignonne
1989: 
1992: 
1993 
1995: 
1996: 
2000:

Bibliography

References

Honours and distinctions 
 Chevalier of the Légion d'honneur
 Holder of the Resistance Medal
 Chevalier of the Ordre des Palmes Académiques

External links 
 Rose Vincent on Babelio
 L’exceptionnelle Rose Vincent obituary on Le Journal de Saône-et-Loire
 Rose Vincent on BilioMonde
 Rose Vincent  on the site of the Académie française
 L'Enfant de Port-Royal. Le roman de Jean Racine on Éditions du Seuil
 Rose Vincent on Charles de Gaulle.org

20th-century French writers
French women journalists
20th-century French journalists
20th-century French women writers
Chevaliers of the Légion d'honneur
Chevaliers of the Ordre des Palmes Académiques
People from Saône-et-Loire
1918 births
2011 deaths
French Resistance members